Fast Stories...from Kid Coma is the debut studio album by the American rock band Truly, released in 1995. The album was put out by Capitol Records' Revolution imprint, while the vinyl edition was handled by Sub Pop. Truly later released a 2020 remaster of the album on their Bandcamp page with the track "Aliens on Alcohol" being restored to the track listing.

Concept
Fast Stories...from Kid Coma is loosely a concept album, about a comatose kid "reliving a past summer of grandeur."

Critical reception
The Encyclopedia of Popular Music called the album "a hard-hitting, insistent record that occasionally overreached in its attempts to distance itself from its contemporaries." Trouser Press wrote: "Heavy but never bludgeoning, melodic but never cheesy, excessive but never ridiculous, Fast Stories is an extended trip into several of rock’s outer dimensions." Loudwire ranked the album at twenty-sixth in their list of "The 30 Best Grunge Albums of All Time." Kerrang! wrote that Fast Stories...from Kid Coma "remains a genuinely vital album, and quite possibly the [grunge] genre’s swan song." Louder Sound named the album in their list of "10 obscure but absolutely essential grunge albums." MTV called it "the great psychedelic hard rock rush of the year."

Track listing
 "Blue Flame Ford" - 6:18
 "Four Girls" - 4:28
 "If You Don't Let It Die" - 3:50
 "Hot Summer 1991" - 5:55
 "Blue Lights" - 4:12
 "Leslie's Coughing up Blood" - 3:41
 "Hurricane Dance" - 8:10
 "Angelhead" - 4:47
 "Tragic Telepathic (Soul Slasher)" - 3:34
 "Virtually" - 4:48
 "So Strange" - 5:06
 "Strangling" - 5:33
 "Chlorine" - 11:27

12″ vinyl track listing / Fast Stories​.​.​. from Kid Coma (2020 Remaster) track listing
 "Blue Flame Ford" - 6:18
 "Four Girls" - 4:28
 "If You Don't Let It Die" - 3:50
 "Hot Summer 1991" - 5:55
 "Blue Lights" - 4:12
 "Leslie's Coughing up Blood" - 3:41
 "Hurricane Dance" - 8:10
 "Angelhead" - 4:47
 "Tragic Telepathic (Soul Slasher)" - 3:34
 "Aliens on Alcohol" - 4:51
 "Virtually" - 4:48
 "So Strange" - 5:06
 "Strangling" - 5:33
 "Chlorine" - 11:27

Personnel

Truly
 Mark Pickerel - drums
 Robert Roth - vocals, guitar
 Hiro Yamamoto - bass guitar
Additional personnel
 Eamon Nordquist - Guitar (tracks 11, 12, & 13)

Production
 John Agnello - producer, mixing (tracks 1, 2, 9, & 11)
 Jon Auer - Producer (track 7)
 Greg Calbi - mastering
 Jon Dunleavy and Edward Douglas - engineering
 Adam Kasper- Producer, mixing (tracks 3, 5, 6, 8, 12, & 13)
 Erin Kenny - recording

References

1995 debut albums
Truly albums
Albums produced by Adam Kasper
Sub Pop albums